Rich A. Matteson, (born Richmond Albert Matteson, January 12, 1929, Forest Lake, Minnesota – June 24, 1993, Jacksonville, Florida) was an American jazz artist, collegiate music educator, international jazz clinician, big band leader, and jazz composer/arranger.  Euphonium was his primary instrument, although Matteson was proficient on several other low brass instruments, particularly bass trumpet, valve trombone, tuba, and Helicon.  He also was a proficient jazz pianist.  Except for Kiane Zawadi, Matteson was the only significant euphonium soloist in jazz.

Career
Matteson served two years (1950–52) with the U.S. Army bands.  He then studied music at the University of Iowa.  In 1955, he earned a Bachelor of Arts Degree in Music from the University of Iowa College of Liberal Arts (his principal instruments were tuba and euphonium).  He then taught high school in Durant, Iowa.  In 1957, he moved to Las Vegas. There he performed on bass trumpet, played the tuba in a walking bass style with Bob Scobey (1958), and worked with the Dukes of Dixieland for two years (1959–61). In 1967 he conducted the Brothers Castro Big Band in Mexico City. He joined the faculty of University of North Texas College of Music in 1973. In 1976 he co-founded, with tuba player Harvey Phillips, the Matteson-Phillips Tubajazz Consort, which consisted of three euphoniums, three tubas, and rhythm section.

In 1986, the University of North Florida appointed Matteson the Koger Distinguished Professor of American Music and, upon retirement in 1992, the university named him Distinguished Professor Emeritus.

Awards
 1993 — Inducted into the Jazz Educators Hall of Fame, International Association for Jazz Education
 1992 — Down Beat Lifetime Achievement Award
 2000 — Inducted into the Jacksonville Jazz Festival Hall of Fame for his significant contributions to jazz as an educator and musician

Selected discography
 Uniquely Rich, The Rich Matteson Foundation
 The Sound of the Wasp, Phil Wilson & Rich Matteson
 The Riverboat Five on a Swinging Date, Rich Matteson, Helicon
 Balls, Matteson-Phillips Tubajazz Consort, Harvey Phillips Foundation and Richmond A. Matteson Legacy Productions
 Pardon Our Dust, We're Making Changes, Rich Matteson Sextet - John Allred (musician), Shelly Berg, Jack Petersen, Lou Fischer, Louie Bellson; Four Leaf Clover (FLC CD 131) (1990)

See also
 Euphonium repertoire
 Jack Petersen (guitarist)
 Matteson-Phillips Tubajazz Consort

Audio & video samples of Matteson performing

Personal life
Rich Matteson was born to the marriage of Richmond Albert Matteson (b. 1900 Charles City, IA - d. 1973 Denton, TX) and Bessie Mary Matteson (née Scholer, b. 1904 Zumbro Falls, MN - d. 1986 Rock Island, IL).

 19 Mar 1964 – Matteson married Priscilla A. (nee ?) (b. 1938); they divorced 17 May 1973, Dallas County, TX.  While married, they had two children.
 22 Dec 1973 – Matteson married Michelle L. Cox (b. 1947- ) in Denton, TX

References

1929 births
1993 deaths
People from Forest Lake, Minnesota
American jazz composers
American male jazz composers
American music arrangers
Jazz arrangers
American jazz bandleaders
University of Iowa alumni
University of North Texas College of Music faculty
Musicians from Florida
Swing tubists
American jazz educators
20th-century American composers
Jazz musicians from Minnesota
Jazz musicians from Texas
20th-century American male musicians
Matteson-Phillips Tubajazz Consort members
20th-century jazz composers